Uspenovka is a rural locality (a selo) and the administrative center of Uspenovsky Selsoviet of Zavitinsky District, Amur Oblast, Russia. The population was 275 as of 2018. There are 2 streets.

Geography 
Uspenovka is located 18 km west of Zavitinsk (the district's administrative centre) by road. Kamyshenka is the nearest rural locality.

References 

Rural localities in Zavitinsky District